Al-Markhiya Stadium is a football stadium in Doha, Qatar. The football team Al-Markhiya SC play there.

References

Markhiya
Markhiya Stadium